The 2015 season was the second season in Kerala Blasters FC's existence, as well as their second season in Indian Super League. The club were the runner-up in the 2014 ISL tournament where they lost to Atlético de Kolkata 0–1 in the final. The club appointed former England-U20 manager Peter Taylor as its new manager for the 2015 season after the departure of David James.

Season overview
After the 2014 season, it was announced that David James would not return to the club as head coach and marquee player. On 12 May 2015 it was announced that former England U20 head coach Peter Taylor would take over as the Blasters head coach. New foreign signings coming into the season included Peter Ramage, Stephen Bywater, Bruno Perone, Sanchez Watt, João Coimbra, and marquee signing Carlos Marchena.

The first match of the season was played at the Jawaharlal Nehru Stadium, with the Kerala Blasters hosting NorthEast United. The Kerala Blasters won 3–1 through goals from Josu, Mohammed Rafi, and Sanchez Watt. However, the Blasters followed that victory drawing their next match against Mumbai City and then losing their next four matches which eventually led to the dismissal of Peter Taylor as head coach. Assistant coach Trevor Morgan was in charge for one match before Terry Phelan was named head coach for the rest of the season. Fortunes failed to change for the Kerala Blasters as the club ended their second season in last place, failing to qualify for the Indian Super League finals.

Players and staff

Squad

Source: Indian Super League 2015

Transfers

In

Pre-season

During the season

Out

Pre-season

During the season

Loan in

Pre-season

During the season

Loan Out

Pre-season

Pre-season

Indian Super League

League table

Results summary

Results by round

Matches

Squad statistics

Appearances and goals 

|-
|colspan="14"|Players who left Kerala Blasters due to injury during the season:

|-
|colspan="14"|Players who left Kerala Blasters during the season:

|-
|}

Goal scorers

Disciplinary record

Home Stadium Attendances

References

Kerala Blasters FC seasons
Kerala Blasters FC